The International Banana Museum is a museum located in Mecca, California, dedicated to the banana. The one-room museum contains more than 20,000 items related to bananas. In 1999, the museum set a Guinness World Record as the largest museum devoted to a single fruit.

History
The museum was conceived by Ken Bannister, who founded it in 1976. In 1972, Bannister was a president of a photographic equipment manufacturing company, and at a manufacturers' conference, he handed out thousands of Chiquita banana stickers. His joke was that since the banana was shaped like a smile, it might encourage people to do so. 

Encouraged by the positive response, Bannister created the International Banana Club and was designated as the "Top Banana". He started receiving banana-related items in the mail, but began to run out of room for all of them. The International Banana Club and Museum subsequently began to operate in Altadena in a rented building. 

The Banana Club would eventually grow to 35,000 members in 17 different countries. Donating a banana-related item to the museum would enable one to join the Banana Club, with a nickname and ability to earn "banana merit points", and obtain a degree in "Bananistry". President Ronald Reagan was a member of the club.

In 2005, Bannister relocated the museum to a rent-free city-owned space in Hesperia. However, in 2010, the Hesperia Recreation and Park District wanted the museum to move out to make room for a new exhibit. Bannister placed the entire collection on eBay for $45,000. Eventually he had to lower the price to $7,500. In 2010, Fred Garbutt bought the collection for an undisclosed amount, moving it to Mecca and becoming the new curator; it was reported that Bannister had agreed to a purchase price below $7,500.

Description
In 1999, the museum won a Guinness World Record as the largest museum devoted to a single fruit. At the time, it held a collection of 17,000 items.

The collection includes  kitschy items such as a "banana couch, banana soda, gold-plated banana, banana boogie board, and banana ears". The museum houses the only petrified banana in the world, which came from the closet of a girl in Kentucky. The museum is family-friendly, despite a history of people sending in lewd objects.

There is also a Banana Bar that serves banana-related food and drinks.

References

External links
Home page

Bananas
Museums in Riverside County, California
Museums established in 1976
1976 establishments in California